Interiors is the second studio album by American musician Glasser (Cameron Mesirow), released on October 7, 2013 by True Panther Sounds. Much like its 2010 predecessor Ring, Interiors was well-received by critics.

Track listing
"Shape" – 4:57
"Design" – 3:15
"Landscape" – 3:59
"Forge" – 4:32
"Window I" – 1:47
"Keam Theme" – 4:11
"Exposure" – 3:41
"Dissect" – 4:14
"Window III" – 1:58
"Window II" – 1:14
"New Year" – 3:21
"Divide" – 5:31

References

2013 albums
Glasser (musician) albums